The 2005 Dodge/Save Mart 350 was the 16th stock car race of the 2005 NASCAR Nextel Cup Series season and the 17th iteration of the event. The race was held on Sunday, June 26, 2005, in Sonoma, California, at the club layout in Infineon Raceway, a  permanent road course layout. The race took the scheduled 110 laps to complete. At race's end, Tony Stewart of Joe Gibbs Racing would best Ricky Rudd of Wood Brothers Racing, passing him in the closing laps of the race to win his 20th career NASCAR NEXTEL Cup Series race and his first of the season. To fill out the podium, Kurt Busch of Roush Racing would finish third.

Background 

Infineon Raceway is one of two road courses to hold NASCAR races, the other being Watkins Glen International. The Chute was only used for NASCAR events such as this race, and was criticized by many drivers, who preferred the full layout.

Entry list 

*The #71 would withdraw for the race. Mike Wallace, originally intended to drive the #4, would be switched to P. J. Jones, originally slated to drive the #71.

Practice

First practice 

Second practice 
The second practice session would take place on Saturday, June 25, at 9:30 AM PST and would last for 45 minutes.

Third and final practice 
The third and final practice session would take place on Saturday, June 25, at 11:10 AM PST and would last for 45 minutes.

Qualifying 
Qualifying would take place on Friday, June 24, at 3:10 PM PST. Drivers would each have one lap to set a time.

Two drivers would spin during qualifying: first, Elliott Sadler would spin in Turn 10, making him qualify on a provisional. Then, José Luis Ramírez would go off track and spin, causing him to miss the race.

Full qualifying results

Race results

References 

2005 NASCAR Nextel Cup Series
NASCAR races at Sonoma Raceway
June 2005 sports events in the United States
2005 in sports in California